Amber is a town in Grady County, Oklahoma, United States.  The population was 419 at the 2010 census.

Geography
Amber is located at  (35.159613, -97.878766).

The Post Office was established in 1903.

Demographics

As of the census of 2010, there were 419 people living in the town.  The population density was 110 people per square mile (41/km2).  There were 177 housing units at an average density of 45 per square mile (17/km2).  The racial makeup of the town was 89.18% White, 0.20% African American, 4.90% Native American, 1.22% Pacific Islander, 0.20% from other races, and 4.29% from two or more races. Hispanic or Latino of any race were 2.04% of the population.

There were 160 households, out of which 47.5% had children under the age of 18 living with them, 74.4% were married couples living together, 7.5% had a female householder with no husband present, and 16.9% were non-families. 15.6% of all households were made up of individuals, and 5.0% had someone living alone who was 65 years of age or older. The average household size was 3.06 and the average family size was 3.34.

In the town, the population was spread out, with 34.9% under the age of 18, 6.9% from 18 to 24, 29.8% from 25 to 44, 20.0% from 45 to 64, and 8.4% who were 65 years of age or older. The median age was 29 years. For every 100 females, there were 96.8 males. For every 100 females age 18 and over, there were 95.7 males.

The median income for a household in the town was $32,083, and the median income for a family was $34,688. Males had a median income of $24,531 versus $20,375 for females. The per capita income for the town was $12,012. About 9.7% of families and 10.8% of the population were below the poverty line, including 9.2% of those under age 18 and 22.2% of those age 65 or over.

Amber is also the home of Amber-Pocasset Jr. Sr. High School, home of the Panthers.

References

External links
 Encyclopedia of Oklahoma History and Culture - Amber

Towns in Grady County, Oklahoma
Towns in Oklahoma